Stefan Kossecki (1889–1940) was a soldier of the Imperial Russian Army, and Colonel of Infantry of the Polish Army in the Second Polish Republic. Captured by the Soviets in 1939, he was murdered by the NKVD in 1940. On November 9, 2004, Kossecki was posthumously promoted to General brygady.

Early years
Kossecki was born on November 27, 1889, in a Polish noble family (Rawa coat of arms), in the village of Sawince near Kamieniec Podolski, Russian Empire. He was baptised as a Roman Catholic on January 12, 1890. While attending high school in Kamieniec, young Kossecki was a member of a secret Polish patriotic organization "Association of Polish Youth", later joining Union of Active Struggle, which was active in nearby Austrian Galicia.

After graduation in 1911, he joined Imperial Russian Army's 13th Foot Rifles Regiment, which was subjected to Grand Duke Nicholas Nikolaevich. In 1912 Kossecki was promoted to Chorąży.

World War I 
After the outbreak of World War I, he fought in 284th Infantry Regiment. On January 8, 1915, Kossecki was heavily wounded during the campaign in Bukovina. He lost his right hand, and was sent to the hospital. After one year, Kossecki upon his own request returned to the service. Promoted to Stabskapitan, he was awarded Golden Eagle of the Order of St. George.

In late 1917, while at Odessa, Kossecki joined 7th Regiment of Polish Rifles. He was responsible for elimination of pro-Bolshevik elements among the volunteers to the unit. Later on, he was joined Polish I Corps in Russia, commanded by General Józef Dowbor-Muśnicki. He fought the Red Army in Belarus: during the Battle of Rahachow (February 1918), in which his company repelled fanatical Bolshevik regiment of Latvians, he was in 1922 awarded Solver Cross of the Virtuti Militari. After Polish I Corps in Russia was disarmed by the Germans, Kossecki came to former Congress Poland.

Second Polish Republic 
On November 1, 1918, in Warsaw, Kossecki joined newly established Polish Army and helped to open the Ministry of Military Affairs. In 1919 he was sent to Officer School in Poznań, where he lectured. In August 1920, during the Polish–Soviet War, Kossecki fought the Soviets in the area of Toruń.

In 1923–24, he lectured at a NCO School in Bydgoszcz, and on November 3, 1924, Kossecki began studies at Wyższa Szkoła Wojenna in Warsaw. After graduation in 1926, he was promoted to the rank of Officer of Polish General Staff, and Marshal Józef Piłsudski sent him to the Army Inspectorate in Toruń. In 1928, Kossecki was named commandant of 10th Infantry Regiment from Łowicz, where he remained until 1930. In 1930–1934, he lectured at military schools at Zambrów and Bydgoszcz. In 1931, he married Jadwiga née Zaremba, and in 1936 their son Jozef was born.

In 1934, Stefan Kossecki participated in the last military exercise commanded Józef Piłsudski, and was honored by the Marshal, together with Colonel Stanisław Maczek. On January 25, 1935, he was promoted to commandant of infantry of 25th Infantry Division (Kalisz), where he remained until July 1939. On August 20, 1939, Kossecki was named commandant of the 18th Infantry Division (Łomża), which in September 1939 belonged to Independent Operational Group Narew.

1939 Invasion of Poland 
During the September 1939 Campaign, Kossecki fought in the area of Zambrów, against Panzer Corps of General Heinz Guderian. On September 12 near Andrzejewo he was seriously wounded when five German bullets hit him during a charge which he personally led. Kossecki was taken to the hospital at Zambrów, and then to Białystok, the city which in late September was occupied by the Red Army. After leaving hospital (November 1939), he wanted to cross the newly established Soviet–German demarcation line, but was captured by the NKVD near Brześć nad Bugiem.

Death 

Until March 28, 1940, Kossecki was kept in a Soviet prison at Brześć. His further fate is unknown, according to one witness, the Soviets drowned him in the White Sea, together with other Polish prisoners of war. His symbolic tomb is located in the mausoleum of the 18th Infantry Division in Andrzejewo.

In 1964 in London, General Władysław Anders posthumously promoted Stefan Kossecki to Generał brygady. This decision was confirmed on November 9, 2004, by President Aleksander Kwaśniewski. On April 5, 1997, 2nd Regiment of Vistula Army Unit from Czerwony Bór was named after General Kossecki. Also, on January 25, 2008, a street in Zambrów was named after him.

Awards 
 Gold Cross of the Virtuti Militari, 
 Silver Cross of the Virtuti Militari, 
 Officer Cross of the Polonia Restituta, 
 Cross of Independence,	
 Gold Cross of Merit (Poland),	
 Gold Eagle of the Order of St. George

Sources 
 H. P. Kosk, Generalicja Polska, Popularny słownik biograficzny. t. I. A-Ł, Oficyna Wydawnicza AJAKS, Pruszków 1998, s. 248.
 T. Kryska-Karski, S. Żurakowski, Generałowie Polski niepodległej, Wyd. II uzupełnione i poprawione, Editions Spotkania, Warszawa 1991.
 J. Leskiewiczowa (red.) Ziemianie polscy XX wieku. Słownik biograficzny. Część 7, Wyd. DiG, Warszawa 2004.

1889 births
1940 deaths
Polish generals
Polish military personnel of World War II
Polish prisoners of war
Polish people of the Polish–Soviet War
Recipients of the Silver Cross of the Virtuti Militari
Officers of the Order of Polonia Restituta
Polish Army officers
Polish people executed by the Soviet Union